Hartz is a surname, and may refer to:

Donna Hartz, Aboriginal Australian midwife and academic 
Harris Hartz (born 1947), U.S. federal judge 
Harry Hartz (1896—1974), U.S. racecar driver
Jim Hartz (born 1940), U.S. television personality 
Louis Hartz (1919—1986), U.S. political scientist
Nikolaj Hartz (1867—1937), Danish geologist and botanist
Peter Hartz (born 1941), German business executive (Hartz concept)
William J. Hartz, U.S. composer and lyricist

The corporate name may refer to:
Hartz Mountain Industries, a real estate and pet product conglomerate

See also

Hartz Mountains (Tasmania)
Harz Mountains (Germany)